The Sindh expedition was one of Nader Shah's last campaigns during his war in northern India. After his victory over Muhammad Shah, the Mughal emperor, Nader had compelled him to cede all the lands to the west of the Indus River. His return to this region from Delhi was honoured by all the governors of the newly annexed territories save for Khudayar Khan, ruler of Sindh, who was conspicuously absent despite being given a summons like the rest of the governors.

Nader's descent onto Sindh
Nader set out across the Hindu Kush mountains on a 1,700 kilometre journey which came to a close within 2 months. The astonished Khodayar-khan was caught completely off balance and could not gather forces to resist, given the unexpected emergence of the Imperial army as well as the rapidity of its advance into his lands. Completely dismayed and demoralised he surrendered himself to Nader, whence he was chained and all his personal wealth including his treasury confiscated. After the intercedence of a sympathetic governor, Nader reinstated Khodayar-khan as the ruler of Sindh.

See also
 Nader Shah's invasion of the Mughal Empire
 Battle of Khyber Pass
 Battle of Karnal

Further reading
 Axworthy, Michael, Nader Shah: The Sword of Persia, From Tribal Warrior to Conquering Tyrant, I.B. Tauris, 2009
 Lockhart, Laurence, Nadir Shah; A Critical Study Based Mainly Upon Contemporary Sources, London, Luzac & Co 1938

References

Wars involving the Mughal Empire
Wars involving Afsharid Iran
History of Sindh